The 1988 United States presidential election in Georgia took place on November 8, 1988. All 50 states and the District of Columbia, were part of the 1988 United States presidential election. Georgia voters chose 12 electors to the Electoral College, which selected the president and vice president.

Georgia was won by incumbent United States Vice President George H. W. Bush of Texas, who was running against Massachusetts Governor Michael Dukakis. Bush ran with Indiana Senator Dan Quayle as Vice President, and Dukakis ran with Texas Senator Lloyd Bentsen.

The election was very partisan for Georgia, with more than 99 percent of the electorate voting for either the Democratic or Republican parties, and only four parties represented on the statewide ballot. Only two counties failed to give one of the major party nominees an outright majority: Clarke, which gave Dukakis a narrow plurality, and Bibb, which gave Bush a narrow plurality. Bush won four counties that had voted for Walter Mondale in 1984, out of only seven such counties nationwide.

, this is the last election in which Terrell County, Jefferson County, Bibb County, Muscogee County, Liberty County, Richmond County, Dougherty County, and Clayton County voted for a Republican presidential candidate.

Though the Democrats picked the Omni Coliseum in Atlanta as the venue for their National Convention, Georgia weighed in for this election as about 12% more Republican than the national average. This was also the first time that Georgia voted Republican in back-to-back elections.

Bush won Georgia by a landslide margin of 20.25%. His 59.75% vote share made it his 11th-best state in the nation, as Georgia voted 12.5% more Republican than the nation. Even though Dukakis improved on Mondale substantially nationwide, he fell well short even of matching his national vote share in most of the South, including Georgia, marking the region's increasing tendency as an electoral bulwark for the Republican Party except when the Democrats nominated a Southerner at the top of the ticket. Dukakis carried the state's most populous county--Fulton, home of Atlanta--by double digits, and also narrowly carried the Atlanta-area suburb of DeKalb County, the state's second-largest county. However, Bush countered by carrying the next three largest counties by strong, double-digit margins: Cobb and Gwinnett, suburban counties to Atlanta's north, and Chatham, home to Savannah. In particular, he exceeded 70% in both Cobb and Gwinnett. In Chatham, he improved slightly on Reagan's 1984 vote share.

Bush also did well throughout rural Georgia apart from the state's share of the Black Belt, although, despite their large size, Gwinnett and Cobb accounted for his 6th- and 11th-best vote shares out of the state's counties, respectively. As in 1984, Jimmy Carter's home county of Sumter voted Republican, with Bush in fact improving upon Reagan's vote share.

Results

Results by county

See also
 Presidency of George H. W. Bush
 1988 Democratic National Convention - held in Atlanta, GA

Notes

References

Georgia
1988
1988 Georgia (U.S. state) elections